The tawny-throated leaftosser (Sclerurus mexicanus) is a tropical American bird species in the ovenbird family Furnariidae. It is also known as the tawny-throated leafscraper, Middle American leaftosser,  Mexican leaftosser or Mexican leafscraper.

Description
This roughly thrush-sized bird measures 15–17 cm in length and weighs 24–30 g. Its coloration is quite uniformly a rich chestnut brown. The tail is darker, the breast, rump and head are lighter and tinged rufous, though the crown and cheek region are as dark as the body, with some greyish hue to the cheeks. Its iris is dusky brown, the feet are blackish brown. The bill is very long and thin, perhaps by proportion the longest and thinnest of all Furnariidae. It is blackish brown above, and whitish, horn-colored or dark grey below; the tip is black.

Males and females look alike. Young birds are duller, with light streaks and dusky scaling on throat and breast.

The song of the tawny-throated leaftosser is a series of 4–9 wheezy notes which descend, accelerate and fade out as they are given: . For some populations, slightly different songs have been described; subspecies pullus produces a series of sharp  calls or a whistling , while subspecies peruvianus has a series of clear  whistles and its song often ends in a trill. It is not clear whether these vocalizations indicate specific distinctiveness, but it is notable that at least in peruvianus the song often ends with a "flourish" and does not quietly fade out as it does in the northern populations.

The short-billed leaftosser (S. rufigularis) occurs widely in the Amazonas basin. It looks almost alike but it has a shorter bill and its song, while structured similarly, changes in pitch several times through its course rather than simply descending. It is also an inhabitant of terra firme forest near rivers, whereas the tawny-throated leaftosser prefers hilly terrain.

Systematics
The tawny-throated leaftosser is considered to be the sister species of the short-billed leaftosser (S. rufigularis).

Subspecies

 Sclerurus mexicanus mexicanus P.L.Sclater, 1857 – Veracruz (SE Mexico) to N Nicaragua. First recorded in El Salvador on June 12, 1998, but nesting not confirmed. Includes S. m. certus.
Neither dark nor rufous hues very pronounced, but dark and rufous areas clearly contrasting.
 Sclerurus mexicanus pullus Bangs, 1902 – Highlands from Costa Rica to Coclé and Veraguas (W Panama).
Generally darker and less rufous than mexicanus, but throat lighter and rump with pronounced rufous hue.

Range and ecology
The tawny-throated leaftosser ranges from southern Mexico through Central America into Panama. The species is patchily distributed across most of its range. Its natural habitats are tropical moist lowland forests and tropical moist montane evergreen forests. It prefers hilly terrain, occurring mainly between 700 and 2,200 m ASL in Central America'

The species lives on the ground, where it feeds on invertebrates found by flicking through leaf litter, digging in moist soil or in rotting wood, often using the tail to anchor itself; the tips of the rectrices become abraded by this behavior and before moult often just the resilient feather shafts remain. Tawny-throated leaftossers are encountered singly or in pairs; they may be attracted by recordings of their alarm calls. These birds typically move by hopping about and are reluctant to fly if they do not have to. They are not migratory.

Tawny-throated leaftossers are assumed to be monogamous and are territorial, with their territories that are around 25 ha in size. The breeding season – if this species actually has a well-marked breeding season – is prolonged, running at least from December to April in Costa Rica. The nest is a small cup, loosely woven from dry twigs and leaf remains, in a cavity up to 20 cm in diameter at the end of a tunnel – up to 50 cm long but often much shorter – dug into an earth bank or similar spot. Little is known about their breeding biology, but they presumably lay two eggs per clutch.

It is generally an uncommon bird, with a population density usually less than (and often far less than) 5 individuals per square kilometer. It quickly disappears from forests that have been fragmented due to logging, and will not even tolerate selective logging well. Due to its large overall range, it is classified as a Species of least concern by the IUCN>

Footnotes

References
 
 Cuervo, Andrés M.; Hernández-Jaramillo, Alejandro; Cortés-Herrera, José Oswaldo & Laverde, Oscar (2007): Nuevos registros de aves en la parte alta de la Serranía de las Quinchas, Magdalena medio, Colombia [New bird records from the highlands of Serranía de las Quinchas, middle Magdalena valley, Colombia]. Ornitología Colombiana 5: 94–98 [Spanish with English abstract]. PDF fulltext
 Freile, Juan F. & Chaves,  Jaime A. (2004): Interesting distributional records and notes on the biology of bird species from a cloud forest reserve in north-west Ecuador. Bulletin of the British Ornithologists' Club 124(1): 6–16. PDF fulltext
 Greeney, Harold F.; Gelis, Rudolphe A. & White, Richard (2004): Notes on breeding birds from an Ecuadorian lowland forest. Bulletin of the British Ornithologists' Club 124(1): 28–37. PDF fulltext
 Herrera, Néstor; Rivera, Roberto; Ibarra Portillo, Ricardo & Rodríguez, Wilfredo (2006): Nuevos registros para la avifauna de El Salvador. ["New records for the avifauna of El Salvador"]. Boletín de la Sociedad Antioqueña de Ornitología 16(2): 1–19. [Spanish with English abstract] PDF fulltext
 Remsen, J. Van (2003a): 223. Tawny-throated Leaftosser. In: del Hoyo, Josep; Elliott, Andrew & Christie, David A. (eds.): Handbook of Birds of the World (Vol. 8: Broadbills to Tapaculos): 351, plate 29. Lynx Edicions, Barcelona. 
Remsen, J. Van (2003b): 224. Short-billed Leaftosser. In: del Hoyo, Josep; Elliott, Andrew & Christie, David A. (eds.): Handbook of Birds of the World (Vol. 8: Broadbills to Tapaculos): 351, plate 29. Lynx Edicions, Barcelona. 
 Salaman, Paul G.W.; Stiles, F. Gary; Bohórquez, Clara Isabel; Álvarez-R., Mauricio; Umaña, Ana María; Donegan, Thomas M. & Cuervo, Andrés M. (2002): New and noteworthy bird records from the east slope of the andes of Colombia. Caldasia 24(1): 157–189. PDF fulltext

tawny-throated leaftosser
Birds of Central America
Birds of Mexico
Birds of Costa Rica
Birds of Panama
tawny-throated leaftosser
tawny-throated leaftosser

Taxonomy articles created by Polbot